Malangabang (variously Malangaban) is an island and barangay in northeastern Iloilo, Philippines. It is part of the municipality of Concepcion. According to the 2010 census, it has a population of 2,925. Fishing is the main source of income for the island's residents.The Owner is Honorato Ciriaco.

Location and geography 

Malangabang Island is east of Panay Island in the Visayan Sea. Malangabang completely surrounds the small Chico Island. Malangabang's sole barangay is also named Malangabang.

Natural disasters

Typhoon Haiyan 

In 2013, Typhoon Haiyan (locally known as Yolanda) struck Malangabang with  waves, and many residents lost their boats to the storm. All told, the storm destroyed at least 470 boats and 370 houses. After the storm passed, several relief organizations went to Malangabang to deliver aid and offer assistance, including Multicultural Response, the Philippine Medical Association's Doctors on Boat project, and the Korea-based 601 Habitat.

See also 

 List of islands in the Philippines

References

External links 
 Malangabang Island at OpenStreetMap
 Help Philippines Update at Multiucultural Response

Islands of Iloilo
Barangays of Iloilo